Rajeeb Samdani (born 28 March 1974) is a Bangladeshi industrialist and art collector. As of 2021, he is the managing director of Golden Harvest Group, a Bangladeshi conglomerate, and the founder and trustee of Samdani Art Foundation which produces the Dhaka Art Summit.

He is the founding committee member and co-chair of the South Asian Acquisition Committee at the Tate in the  United Kingdom. He is a member of Tate's International Council and founding members of Harvard University Lakshmi Mittal South Asia Institute's Arts Advisory Council in the United States.

Career 
Samdani enrolled at North South University, but never completed his degree. He started his career as a commodity broker with Stemcor at age 23. In 1999, he founded Golden Harvest InfoTech Limited. As the managing director of Golden Harvest Group he expanded the conglomerate beyond information technology into food, logistics, insurance, and real estate.

Samdani is a trustee and secretary general of the Bangladesh Human Rights Foundation, and founder of the Alvina Samdani Trust and Taher Ahmed Choudhury Charitable Hospital.

Along with his wife Nadia Samdani, Rajeeb Samdani has collected over 2,000 artworks.

Art foundation 

Samdani Art Foundation was established in 2011 by Rajeeb Samdani and his wife Nadia Samdani. The foundation is based in Dhaka, Bangladesh and supports country's contemporary art and architecture.  Through the foundation, Samdani funded the Kunsthalle Basel's first exhibition of a South Asian artist, Naeem Mohaiemen in 2014. The foundation is a donor for the 56th International Biennale di Venezia, supporting the projects of artists Naeem Mohaiemen and Raqs Media Collective in the main Biennale exhibition: All the World's Futures. Bangladeshi-British artist Rana Begum's first major institutional solo exhibition at Parasol Unit, London was also supported through Samdani Art Foundation in 2016. They also support Bangladeshi artists to produce works for exhibitions. Some of the supported exhibitions are the Kochi-Muziris Biennale 2014, Shanghai Biennale 2016, and Kunsthalle Zurich. The foundation supports emerging artists and architects with the biannual Samdani Art and Samdani Architecture awards.
Another program of the foundation, The Samdani Artist-Led Initiatives Forum launched on 13 April 2017 supports the work of Bangladesh's independently established and self-funded art collectives and initiatives.

The Samdanis have organised the Dhaka Art Summit, a non-profit event funded by Samdani Art Foundation from 2012. It attracted more than 50,000 visitors its first year. Dhaka Art Summit takes place in every two years at the Bangladesh Shilpakala Academy in collaboration with the Ministry of Cultural Affairs. The 5th edition of the Dhaka Art Summit took place from 7 to 15 February 2020 and drew 477,000 visitors.

Their new initiative is the Srihatta—Samdani Art Centre and Sculpture Park, which is the forthcoming permanent art space established under the Samdani Art Foundation. Srihatta will be the first permanent dedicated space for the Foundation's programming and exhibition activities. The centre is designed by Kashef Mahboob Chowdhury, who won the Agha Khan Award in 2016. This is also the country's first sculpture park and dedicated art space for international modern and contemporary art.

Awards and recognition 

The Samdanis are known for their local and international art collection. Works from their collection have travelled to major exhibitions, such as the Gwangju Biennale, South Korea (2014); Kochi-Muziris Biennale, India (2014); Centre Pompidou, Paris (2015); Kunstsammlung Nordrhein-Westfalen, Düsseldorf (2016); documenta 14 (2017); and Shanghai Biennale (2017).

In 2017, Samdani and his wife received the Montblanc de la Culture Arts Patronage Award for founding the Samdani Art Foundation and the Dhaka Art Summit.  They were recognized on the Top 200 Collectors list by ARTnews from 2015 to 2020,  The World's Top 100 Art Collectors 2016 by Artnet News. and the Power 100 list from 2015 through 2022 by ArtReview.

References 

1974 births
Living people
Bangladeshi businesspeople